The 1948 Croydon North by-election was a parliamentary by-election held in the British House of Commons constituency of Croydon North on 11 March 1948.  The seat had become vacant when the Conservative Member of Parliament Henry Willink had resigned, having held the seat since a by-election in 1940.

The Conservative candidate Fred Harris held the seat for his party with a much increased majority. The seat had only been marginally Conservative in the 1945 election.

Election results

See also
Croydon North (UK Parliament constituency)
1940 Croydon North by-election
List of United Kingdom by-elections

References

By-elections to the Parliament of the United Kingdom in London constituencies
1948 elections in the United Kingdom
1948 in London
20th century in Surrey
Elections in the London Borough of Croydon
By-elections to the Parliament of the United Kingdom in Surrey constituencies
March 1948 events in the United Kingdom